The following is a list of notable events and releases of the year 1902 in Norwegian music.

Events

Deaths

 January
 17 – Elias Blix (65), organist and composer.

 August
 19 – Lars Fykerud (42), Hardanger fiddler and composer.

Births

 May
 7 – Jolly Kramer-Johansen, composer (died 1968).

 October
 30 – Bias Bernhoft, singer and revue writer (died 1986).

 November
 21 – Harald Lie, solo cellist for the Oslo Philharmonic (died 1942).

See also
 1902 in Norway
 Music of Norway

References

 
Norwegian music
Norwegian
Music
1900s in Norwegian music